The Fond du Lac County Fair is an annual county fair that takes place every July in Fond du Lac, Wisconsin, USA. The first Fond du Lac County Fair took place on September 29, 1852 in Rosendale. The Fond du Lac County Fairs' motto is "Education, Entertainment and Affordable Family Fun." Musical acts headlining the 2015 Grandstand include Grand Funk Railroad, (July 16, 2015) Great White & Slaughter, (July 17, 2015) Montgomery Gentry (July 18, 2015) and other family entertainment such as the Fondy Fair 5K Run/Walk on July 18, 2015. Other Grandstand shows include a tractor pull, horse pull, truck pull, BMX stunt show and a demolition derby.

The only cancelled years were: 1917–18 & 1942–45. In 2020, officials had to limit attendance and cancel concerts & rides caused by the COVID-19 pandemic.

The fairgrounds was used as an automobile racing facility in the early 20th century. Past winners include Bill Endicott in 1912.

Past Grandstand Headliners
2020- NONE
2015- Montgomery Gentry
2015- Slaughter
2015- Great White
2015- Grand Funk Railroad
2014- Collective Soul
2014- Jerrod Niemann
2013- Whitesnake
2013- Hinder
2012- Foreigner
2012- Buckcherry
2012- Easton Corbin

References

External links
 Fond du Lac County Fair
 Fondy Fair 5K
 Fond du Lac County
 City of Fond du Lac

Annual fairs
Festivals in Wisconsin
Tourist attractions in Fond du Lac County, Wisconsin
Fairs in the United States
Recurring events established in 1852
1852 establishments in Wisconsin
Motorsport venues in Wisconsin